Yeremenko, Yeryomenko/Eremenko or Jaromienka is a surname of Ukrainian-language origin. It is common in Ukraine, Belarus, and Russia. Notable people with the surname include:

 Alexei Eremenko (disambiguation), multiple individuals
 Alexander Eremenko (disambiguation), multiple individuals
 Andrey Yeryomenko (1892–1970), Soviet military commander
 Dmitry Yeryomenko (born 1980), Kazakhstani skier
 Ilya Yeryomenko (born 1998), Russian footballer
 Konstantin Yeryomenko (1970–2010), Russian futsal player
 Paul Eremenko (born 1979), American innovator and technology executive
 Dmytro Yeremenko (born 1990), Ukrainian footballer
 Nikolai Yeremenko  (disambiguation), multiple individuals
 Roman Eremenko (born 1987), Finnish footballer
 Ruslan Yeremenko (born 1978), Ukrainian pole vaulter
 Sergei Eremenko (born 1999), Finnish footballer
 Svitlana Yeremenko (born 1959), Ukrainian journalist
 Vasili Eremenko (born 1973), Ukrainian figure skater
 Vera Yeremenko (born 1983), Kazakhstani alpine skier
 Victor Valentine Eremenko, American physicist
 Vladislav Yeryomenko (born 1999), Belarusian ice hockey player
 Yaroslav Yeremenko (born 1989), Ukrainian DJ

See also
 
 
 

Ukrainian-language surnames